The Juno Award for Best Roots and Traditional Album was an annual award category, presented by the Juno Awards from 1989 to 1995 to honour achievements in roots music.

The award was discontinued after 1995, when it was split into distinct categories for Juno Award for Roots & Traditional Album of the Year – Solo and Juno Award for Roots & Traditional Album of the Year – Group.

Winners and nominees

References

Roots
Album awards